The Waitekuri River is a river of the Coromandel Peninsula in New Zealand's North Island. It flows east from its sources in the Coromandel Range east of Coromandel to reach Whangapoua Harbour four kilometres south of Whangapoua.

See also
List of rivers of New Zealand

References

Thames-Coromandel District
Rivers of Waikato
Rivers of New Zealand